Lord Ronald Charles Sutherland-Leveson-Gower (2 August 1845 – 9 March 1916), was a British sculptor, best known for his statue of Shakespeare in Stratford-upon-Avon. He also wrote biographies of Marie Antoinette and Joan of Arc, as well as serving as Liberal Member of Parliament for Sutherland. He was accused by the Prince of Wales of “unnatural practices” and was one of several society figures implicated in the Cleveland Street Scandal, where a male brothel was raided by police.

Early life
Born on 2 August 1845, he was the youngest son of eleven children, seven daughters and four sons, born to George, 2nd Duke of Sutherland (and 20th Earl) by his wife Lady Harriet Howard. His surviving siblings included Lady Elizabeth Georgiana (1824–1878), who married the 8th Duke of Argyll; Lady Evelyn Gower (1825–1869), who married the 12th Lord Blantyre; Lady Caroline Gower (1827–1887), who married the 4th Duke of Leinster; George Gower (1828–1892), who became the 3rd Duke of Sutherland; Lady Constance Gower (1834–1880), who married the 1st Duke of Westminster; and Lord Albert Gower (1843–1874), who married Grace Abdy.

His paternal grandparents were George Leveson-Gower, 1st Duke of Sutherland and his wife Elizabeth Gordon, suo jure Countess of Sutherland.  His maternal grandparents were George Howard, 6th Earl of Carlisle and Lady Georgiana Cavendish (1783–1858), herself the daughter of William Cavendish, 5th Duke of Devonshire, and Lady Georgiana Spencer.

He was educated at Eton and at Trinity College, Cambridge.

Career
From 1867 to 1874, Gower served as a Liberal Member of Parliament for Sutherland.  He made only one speech in the House, even though he held the seat for many years.  Reportedly, "it was with some relief that, with the resignation of Gladstone's government at the beginning of 1874, he relinquished" his seat. He was succeeded as MP by his nephew Cromartie, Marquess of Stafford (the elder surviving son of his eldest brother the 3rd Duke of Sutherland).

He was a Trustee of the National Portrait Gallery and of the Birthplace and Shakespeare Memorial Building at Stratford-on-Avon.

In 1889, he travelled to America and donated several of his works to prominent American museums.

Creative work

A sculptor, he also published a number of works on the fine arts. Lord Ronald shared a studio in Sir Joshua Reynolds's old home in Leicester Square with John O'Connor, an Irish landscape painter and theatrical designer.  In 1875, he travelled to Paris to begin sculpting in the studio of Albert-Ernest Carrier-Belleuse, one of the founding members of the Société Nationale des Beaux-Arts.

Gower's most important sculpture was the statue of Shakespeare and four of his principal characters, erected in Stratford-upon-Avon. He also created a sculpture depicting Marie Antoinette on her way to the scaffold and another of a member of the Old Guard at Waterloo.

He also wrote biographies of Marie Antoinette and Joan of Arc and a history of the Tower of London.  He furthermore published My Reminiscences (pub. 1883), which was a memoir of his upbringing and life, as well as Old Diaries 1881–1901 (pub. 1902).

Personal life

Gower, who never married, was well known in the homosexual community of the time. Oscar Wilde's story The Portrait of Mr. W. H. has been interpreted as a comment on Gower's social circle; Gower is generally identified as the model for Lord Henry Wotton in The Picture of Dorian Gray. In 1879, hints of his homosexual liaisons published in the journal Man of the World led Gower to sue the paper, but later in the year the Prince of Wales sent him a letter accusing him of being "a member of an association for unnatural practices", to which Gower wrote an angry reply.

John Addington Symonds, who stayed with him once, stated that Gower "saturates one's spirit in Urningthum [homosexuality] of the rankest most diabolical kind". His most notable relationship was with the journalist Frank Hird (1873–1937), which lasted to the end of Gower's life. Gower later adopted Hird as his son, leading Wilde to remark on one occasion: "Frank may be seen, but not Hird." Gower died on 9 March 1916 at his home in Tunbridge Wells, Kent. He is buried, together with Hird, at St Paul's Church, Rusthall, Kent.

1890 scandal
In 1890, Gower was implicated in the Cleveland Street Scandal. The Cleveland Street Scandal itself took place in 1889 when a homosexual male brothel in Cleveland Street, Fitzrovia, London was discovered by police.  Among others, it was rumoured that Prince Albert Victor, the eldest son of the Prince of Wales and 2nd in line to the British throne, had visited the brothel. In 1890, Lord Ronald as well as Lord Errol were implicated, along with prominent social figure Alexander Meyrick Broadley, who fled abroad for four years. The Paris Figaro even alleged that Broadley took General Georges Boulanger and Henri Rochefort to the house.

1913 scandal
In 1913, Francis R. Shackleton (brother of the famed Antarctic explorer Sir Ernest Shackleton) was charged with defrauding Gower of his fortune.  Reportedly, Gower entrusted Shackleton with $25,000 for him to invest in 1910.  Shackleton induced Gower to purchase 5,000 shares in the City of Montevideo Public Works Corporation, which were essentially worthless shares that only benefited Shackleton.  The amount stolen by Shackleton was later claimed to be upwards of $200,000 from Gower and $30,000 from his "confidential friend", Frank Hird.  It was alleged that Shackleton initially met Ronald in 1905 and Hird in 1907, whom The New York Times referred to as Lord Ronald's adopted son.  Due to the loss, he was forced to sell his country house, Hammerfield at Penshurst in Kent, to Arnold Hills.

References
Notes

Sources
 Aronson, Theo (1994). Prince Eddy and the Homosexual Underworld. London: John Murray.

External links

 
 
 Biography at Centre for Whistler Studies
 Website suggesting link to Oscar Wilde 
 
 Lord Ronald Charles Sutherland-Leveson-Gower (1845–1916) at the National Portrait Gallery, London

1845 births
1916 deaths
19th-century British sculptors
19th-century Scottish people
20th-century British sculptors
Alumni of Trinity College, Cambridge
British gay writers
Gay politicians
LGBT members of the Parliament of the United Kingdom
Scottish LGBT politicians
Ronald Gower
Members of the Parliament of the United Kingdom for Scottish constituencies
People educated at Eton College
Place of birth missing
Politics of Highland (council area)
Scottish Liberal Party MPs
Scottish art critics
Scottish biographers
Scottish male sculptors
Scottish sculptors
Sutherland
UK MPs 1865–1868
UK MPs 1868–1874
Younger sons of dukes